Vrbas is a village in the municipality of Donji Vakuf, Bosnia and Herzegovina.

Demographics 
According to the 2013 census, its population was 177.

References

Populated places in Donji Vakuf